Paperwhite may refer to:

 Paperwhite (band), an American synthpop group
 Kindle Paperwhite, an e-book reader
 Narcissus papyraceus or Paperwhite, a perennial bulbous plant
 Narcissus tazetta or Paperwhite, a perennial ornamental plant